Achnatherum pekinense is a species of flowering plant in the family Poaceae which is endemic to China where it can be found on elevation of  and was introduced to Japan and Korea as well.

Description

References

pekinense
Flora of China
Flora of Japan
Flora of Korea
Plants described in 1877